Ibrakayevo (İbraqay) is a rural locality (a village) in Sterlibashevsky Selsoviet, Sterlibashevsky District, Bashkortostan, Russia. The population was 404 as of 2010. There are 5 streets.

Geography 
Ibrakayevo is located 7 km northeast of Sterlibashevo (the district's administrative centre) by road. Stary Kalkash is the nearest rural locality.

References 

Rural localities in Sterlibashevsky District